2nd Duke of Buckingham  may refer to:

 Edmund Sheffield, 2nd Duke of Buckingham and Normanby (1716–1735), English nobleman
 George Villiers, 2nd Duke of Buckingham (1628–1687), English statesman
 Henry Stafford, 2nd Duke of Buckingham (1455–1483), Knight of the Garter
 Richard Temple-Grenville, 2nd Duke of Buckingham and Chandos (1797–1861), British politician